Ali Ihmayda Ashour Shaaban, M.A., (born 1960) is a judge and a Libyan politician. Born in the city of Khoms, he was named Justice Minister on 22 November 2011 by Abdurrahim El-Keib. Prior to the 2011 Libyan Civil War, Ali Ashour was a chancellor at Misrata Central Court.

References

Justice ministers of Libya
Members of the National Transitional Council
Members of the Interim Government of Libya
People of the First Libyan Civil War
Libyan Sunni Muslims
1960 births
Living people